Hasnabad Assembly constituency was an assembly constituency in North 24 Parganas district in the Indian state of West Bengal.

Overview
As a consequence of the orders of the Delimitation Commission, Hasnabad Assembly constituency ceases to exist from 2011. Prior to 2011 Basirhat had one assembly constituency. From 2011 it will have two constituencies Basirhat Dakshin Assembly constituency and Basirhat Uttar Assembly constituency.

It was part of Basirhat (Lok Sabha constituency).

Members of Legislative Assembly

Election results

1977-2006
Gautam Deb of CPI(M) won the 96 Hasnabad seat defeating Rafiqul Islam Mondal of Trinamool Congress in 2006 and 2001, and of Congress in 1996, Anath Bandhu Mitra of Congress in 1991 and Ananta Roy of Congress in 1987. Amiya Bhusan Banerjee of CPI(M) defeated Sekendar Kayal of MUL in 1982 and Mollah Tasmatullah in 1977.

1951-1972
Molla Tasmatulla of Congress won in 1972 and 1971. Abdur Razzaque Khan of CPI won in 1969. H.N.Mazumdar of Bangla Congress won in 1967. Dinabandhu Das of Congress won in 1962. Hemanta Kumar Ghoshal of CPI and Ramkrishna Mondal of Congress won the Hasnabad joint seat in 1957. In independent India’s first election in 1951, Dinesh Chandra Sen of Congress and Ram Krishna Mondal of Congress won the Hasnabad joint seat.

References

Former assembly constituencies of West Bengal
Politics of North 24 Parganas district